Daniel Chester French (1850–1931) was an American sculptor who was active in the nineteenth and twentieth centuries. He was born in Exeter, New Hampshire, to Anne Richardson French and Henry Flagg French on April 20, 1850. His father, a polymath, was a judge and college president who popularized the French drain. In 1867, the family moved to Concord, Massachusetts, and French enrolled at the Massachusetts Institute of Technology. French did not perform well academically and, after a year, he left the college and returned to Concord where he first learned sculpture while attending art classes with Louisa May Alcott. Between 1869 and 1872, French studied anatomy with William Rimmer, and in 1870 he undertook a one-month apprenticeship with the sculptor John Quincy Adams Ward. After completing The Minute Man in 1875, French studied sculpture in Florence, Italy, for a year, during part of which he worked out of Thomas Ball's studio.

French's education ended and career began in 1876 when he accepted a contract to produce a set of statues for the United States Post Office Department. He created statues for the Post Office throughout the 1880s. In 1883, French was commissioned to create John Harvard. For the rest of his career, French produced commissions for state, federal, and private groups as well as private individuals. In 1896, he moved his studio to Chesterwood, in Stockbridge, Massachusetts, where it remained until his death. In 1912, French was appointed as chair of the United States Commission of Fine Arts. He continued to be on the commission until 1915, when he resigned to accept his most famous commission, Abraham Lincoln, which sits in the Lincoln Memorial. On October 7, 1931, French died in his sleep.

French was a prolific sculptor, creating 92 public sculptures from 1871 until his death in 1931. His sculptures are mostly in the eastern and midwestern United States, but one, Thomas Starr King, is in San Francisco, and two, General George Washington and the Marseillaise Memorial, are in France. The majority of the sculptures are bronze castings or made of stone, but Progress of the State is gilded copper and Alma Mater and The Republic are gilded bronze. Nearly all of French's works are solo, but eight, Ulysses S. Grant, General George Washington (Paris), Joseph Hooker, General George Washington (Chicago), General Charles Devens, Indian Corn, Wheat, and Progress of the State, were the result of a collaboration with Edward Clark Potter. General Philip H. Sheridan was a completion of an unfinished statue by John Quincy Adams Ward, and the Daniel Webster Memorial was completed by Margaret French Cresson after French's death.

Public sculpture

References

Notes

Citations

Bibliography 

 
 

French, Daniel Chester
French, Daniel Chester